WestJet Airlines Ltd. is a Canadian low-cost carrier headquartered in Calgary, Alberta, near Calgary International Airport. It is the second-largest Canadian airline, behind Air Canada, operating an average of 777 flights and carrying more than 66,130 passengers per day. In 2018, WestJet carried 25.49 million passengers, making it the ninth-largest airline in North America by passengers carried.

WestJet was founded in 1994 and began operations in 1996. It began as a low-cost alternative to the country's competing major airlines. WestJet provides scheduled and charter air service to more than 100 destinations in Canada, the United States, Europe, Asia, Mexico, Central America, and the Caribbean.

WestJet is owned by Kestrel Bidco Inc., a subsidiary of Onex Corporation,. Although not a formal member of any airline alliance, WestJet has codeshare agreements with many other airlines. It operates two variants of the Boeing 737 Next Generation family, the Boeing 737 MAX, as well as a Boeing 787 aircraft, on select long-haul routes.

WestJet has two direct subsidiaries: WestJet Encore, which operates the Bombardier Q400; and WestJet Link, which operates the Saab 340B through a seat capacity purchase agreement with Pacific Coastal Airlines.

In 2018, WestJet had passenger revenues of CAN$4.733 billion. WestJet is the number 1 airline in Canada and third best airline in North America as per SKYTRAX 2022 World Airline Awards.

History

1994–1999: First flights

Westjet was founded on June 27, 1994, by Clive Beddoe, David Neeleman, Mark Hill, Tim Morgan, and Donald Bell. WestJet was based on the low-cost carrier business model pioneered by Southwest Airlines and Morris Air in the United States. Its original routes were all located in Western Canada, which gave the airline its name.

On February 29, 1996, the first WestJet flight (a Boeing 737-200) departed. Initially, the airline served Calgary, Edmonton, Kelowna, Vancouver and Winnipeg with a fleet of three used Boeing 737-200 aircraft and 225 employees. By the end of that same year, the company had added Regina, Saskatoon and Victoria to its network.

In mid-September 1996, WestJet's fleet was grounded due to a disagreement with Transport Canada over maintenance schedule requirements. The airline suspended all service for two weeks before resuming flights.

In early 1999, Clive Beddoe stepped down as WestJet's CEO and was replaced by former Air Ontario executive Steve Smith.  In July 1999, WestJet made its initial public offering of stock at 2.5 million shares, opening at $10 per share. The same year, the cities of Thunder Bay, Grande Prairie, and Prince George were added to WestJet's route map.

In 2000, WestJet CEO Steve Smith was released from WestJet after 18 months in the position, apparently due to differences about management style;  Smith went on to head rival Air Canada's low-cost subsidiary Zip.  After Smith's departure, Clive Beddoe again became CEO of the company, a position he held until July 2007.

2000–2003: Domestic expansion

Due to restructuring in the Canadian airline industry resulting from Air Canada's takeover of Canadian Airlines in 2000, WestJet expanded into Eastern Canada, beginning service to the cities of Hamilton and Ottawa, Ontario, and Moncton, New Brunswick. The airline selected John C. Munro Hamilton International Airport to be the focus of its Eastern Canadian operations and its main connection point in Eastern Canada.

In 2001, WestJet's expansion continued with routes to Fort McMurray and Comox. It also added Sault Ste. Marie, Sudbury, Ontario, Thompson and Brandon, Manitoba; however, service to each of these four cities has since been withdrawn. Service to Brandon, Manitoba and Sudbury, Ontario, was subsequently resumed by WestJet's wholly owned subsidiary, WestJet Encore.

In 2002, the airline also added another two new Eastern Canadian destinations: the Ontario cities of London and Toronto. In April 2003, WestJet added Windsor, Montreal, Halifax, St. John's and Gander.

WestJet entered into a two-year agreement with Air Transat in August 2003 whereby WestJet aircraft would be filled by Transat's two main tour operators, World of Vacations and Transat Holidays. These chartered flights operated largely to destinations in Mexico and the Caribbean and the planes were operated by WestJet crews. This agreement between WestJet and Air Transat was amicably terminated in February 2009.

In 2004, rival airline Air Canada accused WestJet of industrial espionage and filed a civil suit against WestJet in Ontario Superior Court. Air Canada accused WestJet of accessing Air Canada confidential information via a private website in order to gain a business advantage. On May 29, 2006, WestJet admitted to the charges leveled by Air Canada and agreed to pay C$5.5 million in legal and investigation fees to Air Canada and donate C$10 million to various children's charities in the names of Air Canada and WestJet.

2004–2006: International expansion
In January 2004, WestJet announced that it was moving the focus of its Eastern operations from Hamilton to Toronto the following April, fully moving into the lucrative Toronto-Ottawa-Montreal triangle and tripling the total number of its flights out of Toronto Pearson International Airport. 

In 2004, a number of U.S. destinations were added or announced. These included San Francisco, Los Angeles, Phoenix, Tampa, Fort Lauderdale, Orlando and LaGuardia Airport in New York City. In early 2005, Palm Springs and San Diego were added to the company's list of destinations, while New York-LaGuardia was dropped. In April 2005, it announced new seasonal service to Charlottetown and ceased service to Gander. In fall 2005, Ft. Myers and Las Vegas were added to the growing list of destinations.

In late August 2005, WestJet flew to Baton Rouge, Louisiana, transporting members of a Vancouver-based urban search and rescue team to assist with Hurricane Katrina relief efforts.

After rumours and speculation surrounding the implementation of extended-range twin-engine operations (ETOPS), WestJet announced new service to the Hawaiian Islands from Vancouver on September 20, 2005. In December 2005, the airline began flying from Vancouver to Honolulu and Maui.

WestJet's first scheduled service outside Canada and the United States began in 2006, to Nassau, Bahamas. This was considered a huge milestone within the company's long-term destination strategy and was a vital goal for future international market presence.

In September 2006, Sean Durfy took over as President of WestJet from founder Clive Beddoe.

On October 26, 2006, WestJet announced that it had its best quarterly profit to date, of C$52.8 million.

2007–2009: Continued growth

In 2007, WestJet announced that it would begin flights from Deer Lake in Newfoundland, Saint John in New Brunswick and Kitchener-Waterloo in Ontario. In June 2007, WestJet added seven new international seasonal flights to Saint Lucia, Jamaica, the Dominican Republic, Mexico as well as a third Hawaiian destination, Kona.

The same year, WestJet commissioned the construction of a new six-story head office building, next to their existing hangar facility at the Calgary International Airport. The building was constructed following the Leadership in Energy and Environmental Design (LEED) Green Building Rating System, featuring a rainwater retention system and geothermal heating. The first employees moved in during the first quarter of 2009, and the building officially opened the following May.  The WestJet Campus building was certified as LEED Gold standard in October 2011.

In May 2008, WestJet launched daily non-stop service to Quebec City. The next month, WestJet commenced seasonal service between Calgary and New York City via Newark Liberty International Airport. In May 2009, the airline launched new seasonal service to the cities of Yellowknife, Northwest Territories and Sydney, Nova Scotia; service to Yellowknife was later extended through the winter of 2009–10.

During the 2000s (decade), WestJet made significant gains in domestic market share against Air Canada. In 2000 it held only 7% to Air Canada's 77%, though by the end of 2009 WestJet had risen to 38%, against Air Canada's 55%.

In late April 2009, WestJet temporarily suspended service to several of its destinations in Mexico due to the outbreak of influenza A (H1N1) in the country. The suspension of service to Cabo San Lucas, Mazatlán and Puerto Vallarta lasted from early May until mid-June, with seasonal service to Cancún being restored the following fall.

In July 2009, WestJet announced 11 new international destinations for its winter schedule. These included expanded service to the United States, to Atlantic City, New Jersey, Lihue (Kauai), Hawaii and Miami, Florida. New Caribbean destinations included Providenciales, in the Turks and Caicos Islands; St. Maarten, Netherlands Antilles; Freeport, Bahamas; as well as the cities of Varadero, Holguín and Cayo Coco in Cuba. Ixtapa and Cozumel were also added to the list of destinations served in Mexico.

In November 2009, WestJet announced service to the British island territory of Bermuda, which commenced in May 2010.  WestJet also resumed seasonal service to Windsor, Ontario that same month.

2010–2016: Overseas expansion 
In March 2010, Sean Durfy resigned from his position as WestJet's CEO, citing personal reasons. He was replaced by Gregg Saretsky, a former executive at Canadian Airlines and Alaska Airlines and previously Vice-President of WestJet Vacations and Executive Vice-President of Operations.

In July 2010 WestJet announced service to Santa Clara, Cuba, New Orleans and Grand Cayman bringing the total number of destinations to 71. Service to New Orleans lasted only one season and did not return the next year.

In late 2010 WestJet announced it was wet-leasing a Boeing 757 aircraft to expand service between Calgary to Honolulu and Maui and Edmonton to Maui, on a seasonal basis.

Also that year, the Canadian Transportation Agency (CTA), an independent administrative tribunal of the Government of Canada that regulates airlines, found WestJet's baggage policies to be unreasonable and/or contrary to the requirements of the Canada Transportation Act and/or the Air Transport Regulations on several different occasions.

On January 26, 2011, after Air Canada terminated California service, WestJet announced plans to enter service to John Wayne Airport in Orange County, California ,from Vancouver and Calgary starting May of that year.

In November 2011 WestJet won an auction for time slots at New York's LaGuardia Airport ushering in a return to service to New York. Details of WestJet's scheduled service to LaGuardia were officially announced in January 2012.  From 2012 to 2014, WestJet further expanded into the United States by adding Chicago via O'Hare International Airport, Dallas/Fort Worth International Airport, Myrtle Beach International Airport, and New York's John F. Kennedy International Airport.

On November 15, 2013, WestJet announced their first destination in Europe. Seasonal service from St. John's, Newfoundland to Dublin, Ireland, would operate from June to October 2014.

In January 2014, WestJet chartered an Atlas Air Boeing 747-400 to transport stranded passengers and luggage during the 2013 Central and Eastern Canada ice storm. The charter flew from Lester B. Pearson International Airport to Calgary International Airport.

On July 7, 2014, WestJet announced that it was in the "advanced stages of sourcing" four wide-body aircraft that would begin flying by the fall of 2015. These would initially serve on the seasonal Alberta-Hawaii routes when WestJet's service agreement with Thomas Cook Airlines—who currently fly these routes on behalf of WestJet—expires in the spring of 2015. WestJet would take delivery of four Boeing 767-300ERs in summer 2015. WestJet took delivery of the first of these aircraft on August 27, 2015.

On June 16, 2015, WestJet announced the launch service to London's Gatwick Airport which began on May 6, 2016. It is the carrier's third transatlantic destination after Dublin and Glasgow. The majority of flights to London uses the wide-body Boeing 767-300ER aircraft. On September 15, 2015, WestJet flights to London direct from Edmonton, St. John's, Vancouver, Winnipeg (seasonal) Calgary and Toronto (year-round) went on sale to the public. During winter months, WestJet continues to serve the seasonal Edmonton - Maui, Calgary - Honolulu, and Calgary - Maui flights with the 767-300ER aircraft.

2017–2019: Transition to full-service carrier

In April 2017, WestJet announced plans to launch an ultra-low-cost carrier in late 2017. The new airline would operate using Boeing 737-800 aircraft, and compete with new entrants to the market, such as Flair Airlines. The launch of the new airline, named Swoop, was delayed until June 2018.

While announcing an expansion of the senior leadership team on January 11, 2018, Gregg Saretsky reconfirmed the airline's strategic goal to become a global, full-service carrier.

On March 8, 2018, the CEO of WestJet, Gregg Saretsky retired. He was replaced by company vice-president, Ed Sims.

On May 8, 2018, WestJet announced that it would be adding the Boeing 787-9 Dreamliner to its fleet. The first aircraft was delivered to the airline in January 2019.

On May 10, 2018, WestJet's unionized pilots voted 91 percent in favour of strike action. The key issue in negotiations is outsourcing work to operate the new Swoop carriers. On May 25, 2018, WestJet and the Air Line Pilots Association (ALPA) agreed to a settlement process through the Federal Mediation and Conciliation Service.

On May 14, 2018, WestJet announced new Premium Economy seats to replace the Plus seats, its current premium economy offering. The new seats features a wider 2-2 configuration on the Boeing 737 aircraft. Entry into service on the Boeing 737 MAX 8 aircraft was planned for fall 2018, and the rest of the Boeing 737s would follow in 2019. However, entry into service has been delayed until winter 2018.

On May 31, 2018, WestJet operated its first flight to mainland Europe with the inaugural flight from Halifax Stanfield International Airport to Paris' Charles de Gaulle Airport.

The Canadian Union of Public Employees (CUPE) announced its application to the Canadian Government for certification of WestJet's approximately 3,200 flight attendants on July 9, 2018. On July 31, 2018, the Government of Canada via the Canada Industrial Relations Board (CIRB) issued an interim order certifying CUPE as the accredited union for WestJet mainline flight attendants.

On October 12, 2018, WestJet announced its new branding, along with details on the arrival on the Boeing 787-9. WestJet changed its slogan from "Owners Care" to "Love where you're going", announced a new logo (however, such logo was seen in May with the announcement of the Boeing 787 Dreamliner along with its livery), announced the Boeing 787 routes and launch dates, and an overall new brand image. Boeing 787 flights were announced to commence on April 28, 2019, with service from Calgary International Airport to London Gatwick Airport, with service to Paris and Dublin following.

On May 13, 2019, WestJet announced it had reached an agreement to be purchased by Onex Corporation for $5 billion Canadian dollars. At the time, it had 13 Boeing 737 Max jets in suspended operation, with another 57 of the type ordered from the manufacturer. The purchase price of WestJet was slashed heavily due to the grounding of the MAX aircraft.

2020–2022: COVID-19 pandemic
Due to the COVID-19 pandemic response required by world governments including Canada, WestJet faced an unprecedented decline in demand for flights along with the rest of the aviation industry. In addition, there were numerous cases of COVID-19 reported on board WestJet flights. On March 17, 2020, WestJet shut down all international flights, and on March 24 WestJet laid off 6,900 employees, about half of all staff. However, on April 9 WestJet rehired 6,400 employees temporarily due to the federal wage subsidy program. On April 17, 2020, WestJet announced it was laying off 1,700 pilots. On April 22, 2020, WestJet laid off 3,000 more employees. On June 24, 2020, WestJet laid off a further 3,300 employees as part of a restructuring plan, leaving only 4,500 employees still on payroll at the company. WestJet employed over 14,000 people prior to the start of the pandemic. On February 6, 2021, WestJet laid off 250 more staff, citing recent travel restrictions.

2022-present: Focus on Western Canada and Strategic Low-Cost Plan

On June 16, 2022, WestJet announced that it will be reaffirming the airline’s commitment to "embracing its cost-conscious roots in service of affordable air travel for Canadians". With this in mind, the current CEO has announced that the airline will be returning to its low-cost roots, shifting its focus to western Canada, and investing in leisure routes.

On September 29, 2022, WestJet announced it had placed an order for an additional 42 Boeing 737 MAX 10 aircraft to strengthen its presence in Western Canada. On October 6, 2022, WestJet's CEO, Alexis von Hoensbroech, and Alberta Premier, Jason Kenney, announced a major partnership between the Government of Alberta and the WestJet Group. Calgary International Airport will become WestJet's sole global hub and the company will designate the airport as its "only connecting hub in its network." Additionally, WestJet will base its entire Boeing 787 fleet in Calgary, opening up the potential for new routes to Europe and Asia. WestJet will also base over 100 aircraft in Calgary and double its capacity at the airport before the end of the decade. On December 5, 2022, WestJet announced its first destination in Asia, with service from Calgary International Airport to Narita International Airport beginning with three times weekly service on April 30, 2023. WestJet also announced new routes from Calgary to Barcelona–El Prat Airport and Edinburgh Airport, both being served three times a week beginning in May 2023, as well as frequency increases on existing European routes as a part of their plan to increase capacity in Calgary by more than 25% in 2023.

WestJet Sunwing Acquisition

On March 2, 2022, the WestJet Group announced its intent to acquire Canadian sun-focused airline Sunwing. Both WestJet and Sunwing reported that they had reached a mutual, definitive agreement for the merger. Following the close of the transaction, the two airlines would create a new "tour business operating unit" which would be led by current Sunwing CEO Stephen Hunter, which would bind the two airlines' vacation units - Sunwing Vacations and WestJet Vacations - together. The "tour business operating unit" would be based out of Sunwing's head office in Toronto, while the operations of Sunwing Airlines would be transitioned and managed atWestJet's head office in Calgary. The acquisition announcement was made shortly after WestJet's new CEO Alexis Von Hoensbroech assumed the role. Shortly after, the Canadian Competition Bureau was asked to review this intent. 

On October 26, 2022, the Canadian Competition Bureau sent a letter to the Ministry of Transportation under the Government of Canada, raising "significant concerns" and "uncertainty" on the acquisition. The letter raised concerns about the elimination of competition between the two airlines, which would result in "substantial lessening" or "prevention" of competition in the sale of airline vacation packages to Canadians, specifically to ones which are for sun destinations, such as to Mexico or the Caribbean. The report stated that "the proposed transaction will result in one of Canada's largest integrated tour operations being acquired by one of its primary rivals in the provision of vacation packages." The report also stated that "overall, WestJet and Sunwing account for 37 percent of non-stop capacity between Canada and sun destinations, and 72 percent of non-stop capacity between Western Canada and sun destinations." The report also outlined warnings in which for the acquisition would take place, it would likely result in "higher ticket prices and lower services offered." 

In the report, the Competition Bureau also raised concerns about the "monopoly" that the merger would create on 16 routes between Canada and Mexico or the Caribbean. However, in an emailed statement to the Canadian Broadcasting Corporation which was sent on October 26, 2022 from Sunwing spokesperson Melanie Anne Filipp said that the routes which were identified by the Competition Bureau were "predominately" in Western Canada and accounted for a "very small portion of Sunwing's operations" - just over 10 percent - and were "primarily seasonal routes". As well, Filipp says that 6 out of 16 routes that the Competition Bureau had identified as a concern were no longer being operated by Sunwing. "We remain confident that this transaction is good news for Canadians."

News outlets have also been quoting Air Canada and Air Transat's failed merger. The acquisition, which was set to merge Canada's largest airline with Canada's third largest and top leisure airline, fell through, even after the Canadian government gave Air Canada and Transat the green light to go through with the merger, which saw Air Canada buyout Air Transat for just over US $150 million. It fell through after European Union regulators refused to grant Air Canada and AT Transat the go-ahead for the buyout, which is where Air Transat and Air Canada gain lots of revenue - on trans-Atlantic flights from Canada to Europe. In April 2021, Air Canada and Air Transat mutually agreed to terminate the buyout.

On March 10, 2023, the Canadian Federal Government formally gave the green light to the WestJet Sunwing merger. "Today's decision was not taken lightly, especially in light of everything that happened over the holidays for those who flew with Sunwing,” Canadian Transport Minister Omar Alghabra said in a statement, as he referred to the chaos during the December 2022 North American winter snowstorm that disrupted millions who had travel plans over the winter holidays. Sunwing Airlines' handling over the situation was heavily criticized as it left thousands stranded in Cancun, Mexico. “After considering the pros and cons, we have made the decision that will allow Sunwing to continue to provide affordable vacation packages to Canadians, create more good jobs and protect current jobs as well as Canadians who have already purchased tickets.” he continued. However, with the green light, are several conditions in which the merger must follow. It goes as follows:

· Extending Sunwing vacation packages to five new Canadian cities
· Maintaining a vacations business head office in Toronto and a regional head office in Montreal for at least five years
· Improve regional connectivity and baggage handling
· Boost net employement at Sunwing's aforementioned Toronto head office
· Gradually ending its seasonal plane-leasing practice to protect jobs in Canada (refers to Sunwing's seasonal practices of leasing its Boeing 737 aircraft to airlines in Europe, such as TUI, whom it has leased its aircraft to during the summer season for several years now.)

If the aforementioned points are met, the merger has the green light. However, neither Sunwing or WestJet have made a statement outlining if the merger will even go ahead.

Corporate affairs

Ownership and structure

WestJet is operated by WestJet Airlines Ltd., a private company, incorporated and domiciled in Canada, which since December 2019 has been owned by Toronto-based private equity firm Onex Corporation.

On May 13, 2019, Westjet had announced that it had accepted an offer from Onex Corporation to purchase the company, a $5-billion deal that would require shareholder approval (in July) and regulatory approval. The offer was for $31 a share, substantially higher than the closing price of approximately $18 at the close of trading on the previous business day.  Completion of the acquisition was announced on December 11, 2019, after the regulator had determined that WestJet will continue to meet Canadian ownership and control requirements if Onex amends its bylaws to ensure any matters voted on by the board of directors are done with a majority of Canadian directors present.

Westjet's shares were withdrawn from the market, having previously been publicly traded on the Toronto Stock Exchange (TSX) under the symbol WJA.

WestJet Encore

WestJet Encore is WestJet's affiliated regional airline, which commenced operations on June 24, 2013, with a fleet of Bombardier Q400 twin-turboprop aircraft. WestJet Encore was granted its separate Air Operator Certificate from Transport Canada, on June 12, 2013. It was set up to serve smaller communities in Canada.

WestJet Link

WestJet Link is a subsidiary of WestJet launched in June 2018. Operated by Pacific Coastal Airlines, WestJet Link service from the parent airline's hubs at Calgary and Vancouver to smaller communities, using Saab 340B aircraft which are smaller than the Q400 aircraft operated by Encore.

Swoop

Swoop is an ultra low-cost carrier (ULCC) owned by WestJet that commenced operations on June 20, 2018. Swoop currently operates a fleet of Boeing 737-800 aircraft.

Business trends
The key trends for the WestJet group (including WestJet Encore) are (years ending December 31):

, Annual Accounts do not appear to have been published for the years 2019, 2020, 2021 or 2022. This is likely due to WestJet becoming a private company in 2019.

Destinations

WestJet and WestJet Encore currently fly to 108 destinations in 25 countries throughout North and Central America, the Caribbean and Europe including 36 cities in Canada and 23 in the United States. WestJet's largest hubs in terms of daily departures are Toronto Pearson International Airport, the airline's main connection point in Eastern Canada and Calgary International Airport, the airline's main connection point in Western Canada.

WestJet provides the most Canadian flights to Las Vegas and Orlando, offering non-stop routes (some of them seasonal) from nine Canadian cities to Las Vegas and eleven to Orlando. Since 2008, WestJet is the largest international carrier, by volume of passengers, flying into Las Vegas. WestJet also serves 20 destinations in the Caribbean and seven in Mexico, some on a seasonal basis.

In July 2015, WestJet announced flights to London Gatwick Airport operated by Boeing 767 aircraft, which had not previously been part of the airline's fleet, starting spring 2016.

In January 2018, WestJet announced its first flight to mainland Europe. WestJet started flying between Halifax and Paris in May 2018. The airline in this route is being operated with its new Boeing 737 MAX 8 aircraft.

In October 2018, new international destinations and routes were announced. Starting in 2019, WestJet began direct flights from Calgary to Dublin and Paris. WestJet is using its new Boeing 787 Dreamliner aircraft to fly these new routes. In addition, the current Calgary to London Gatwick Airport route, which was formerly served by WestJet's Boeing 767 aircraft, has been replaced by new Boeing 787 Dreamliner aircraft. At the end of October, WestJet also announced two new destinations. It began flights between Calgary and Atlanta, WestJet's expected joint-venture carrier Delta Air Lines largest hub, in March 2019. WestJet is the only carrier operating a direct route between Calgary and Atlanta. The airline also announced flights between Toronto and Barcelona, its second destination in mainland Europe which began in May 2019. In June 2021, WestJet announced the opening of a new route from Calgary to Amsterdam.

Alliances and codeshare agreements

History

In 1999, WestJet was in talks regarding a possible 'feeder' arrangement for Air Canada's network.  These talks were apparently discontinued when Air Canada went forward with acquisition of Canadian Airlines the following year.

In 2005, WestJet began a limited interline agreement with Taiwan-based China Airlines, in part to test the company's capability to partner with other carriers.

In 2006, WestJet announced it has been in talks with 70 airlines around the world interested in an interline or codeshare agreement. In August 2006, in a Globe and Mail interview, then-WestJet CEO Sean Durfy stated that WestJet was in talks with Oneworld. Durfy said that, if a deal with Oneworld were reached, it would allow WestJet to maintain its scheduling flexibility;  Durfy was later quoted in 2007 saying that a deal for WestJet to join the Oneworld alliance was unlikely.  Despite this, WestJet did formalize a deal with Oneworld in November 2008, to partner on sales of travel to corporate and business travelers.

In July 2008, WestJet announced it had signed a memorandum of understanding to build a distribution and codeshare agreement with U.S.-based Southwest Airlines. However, in April 2010 WestJet announced that the airline partnership with Southwest Airlines was terminated and in October 2010, WestJet partnered with American Airlines instead and later added Delta Air Lines. In light of a possible joint venture between WestJet and Delta, American and WestJet ceased their codeshare agreement on July 31, 2018.

In 2017, WestJet, easyJet and Norwegian Air Shuttle teamed up to provide direct connections at London Gatwick Airport. The scheme, dubbed by easyJet as "Worldwide by easyJet" allows passengers to connect from easyJet flights to American and Canadian destinations with WestJet and Norwegian.

Codeshare agreements
WestJet has codeshare agreements with the following airlines:

 Aeroméxico
 Air France
 Air Transat
 Azores Airlines
 Cathay Pacific
 China Airlines
 China Eastern Airlines
 China Southern Airlines
 Delta Air Lines
 Emirates
 Hainan Airlines
 Hong Kong Airlines
 Japan Airlines
 KLM
 Korean Air
 LATAM Brasil
 LATAM Perú
 Philippine Airlines
 Qantas
 Virgin Atlantic
 XiamenAir

Interline agreements 
WestJet has interlining agreements with the following airlines:

 Aer Lingus
 Aeroflot
 Air China
 Air New Zealand
 Air Tahiti Nui
 Alaska Airlines
 American Airlines
 British Airways
 Canadian North
 Central Mountain Air
 Condor
 El Al
 Etihad Airways
 EVA Air
 Fiji Airways
 Finnair
 Icelandair
 LOT Polish Airlines
 Pakistan International Airlines
 PAL Airlines
 Royal Air Maroc
 TAP Air Portugal
 Tunisair
 Ukraine International Airlines
 United Airlines

Joint venture with Delta Air Lines 
On December 6, 2017, WestJet and Delta Air Lines signed a preliminary memorandum of understanding to extend their current codeshare agreement into a joint venture, pending regulatory and board approval.

On July 19, 2018, WestJet and Delta Air Lines signed a definitive ten-year agreement into a joint venture between the two airlines. This joint venture would have served more than 95% of the Canada-U.S. demand. The airlines' current frequent flier programs would also be updated to be more closely aligned, and the airlines will be co-located at key hub airports. However, in November 2020, Delta Air Lines and WestJet agreed to scrap their plans for a joint venture, as the demands of the United States Department of Transportation were seen "unreasonable and unacceptable" by both airlines. Delta and WestJet have, however, agreed to reciprocal elite member benefits for their respective frequent flyer programs.

Fleet

Current fleet

, WestJet operates an all-Boeing mainline fleet, consisting of the following aircraft:

Fleet strategy
The mainline fleet currently consists exclusively of Boeing aircraft, while wholly owned subsidiary Encore flies Bombardier Q400s. 20 units were originally ordered with options for up to 25 more.  The first two units were delivered in mid-June 2013.  Scheduled passenger service on these aircraft began on June 24, 2013. The first Boeing 737-700 delivery took place in 2001, and the first deliveries of Boeing 737-600 and Boeing 737-800 aircraft began in 2005, with the final 737-600 aircraft delivered in September 2006.

Boeing confirmed on August 2, 2007 that WestJet had placed an order for 23 Boeing 737 Next Generation aircraft. The order was primarily for Boeing 737-700 but with conversion rights to Boeing 737-800s.

In the winter season, WestJet has temporarily wet leased some Boeing 757-200s to expand service between Alberta and Hawaii. From February through April 2011, a single aircraft was leased for this purpose; in the winter of 2011–12, a single aircraft was again leased. For the winter seasons from 2012 to 2015, this was expanded to two aircraft. In April 2013, it was announced that WestJet would sell ten of its oldest 737-700s and purchase ten 737-800s to modernize and increase capacity of its fleet.

In May 2014, CEO Gregg Saretsky announced that WestJet was considering acquiring wide-body aircraft to operate long-haul international routes. By July of the same year, Saretsky confirmed that wide-body service would begin in 2015. In late June 2014, WestJet announced that the wide-body aircraft were to be second-hand Boeing 767-300ERs sourced from Qantas. The four Boeing 767s were an average of 25 years old, which meant that they needed frequent repairs and downtime for sourcing parts. This resulted in a poor on-time performance of 38 percent in 2016, costing the airline approximately $5 million in the second quarter of 2016. In 2017, Westjet reduced the number of flights from Winnipeg and Edmonton to reduce utilization of the planes for the summer 2017, to cope with any unforeseen delays or cancellations.

In late December 2016, 77% of WestJet pilots approved a new deal that will increase pay for pilots flying wide-body aircraft such as the Boeing 767, Boeing 787 and Airbus A330. In a statement, the airline said that it was seeking more large aircraft with the intention of adding new destinations. Saretsky also stated that he hoped for wide-body growth to be responsible, but quick. As of May 2, 2017, WestJet announced the purchase of up to 20 Boeing 787-9 Dreamliner aircraft; 10 were firm orders with deliveries from 2019 through 2021, and 10 were options for delivery between 2020 and 2024.

Historical fleet

In early 2005, it was announced that the Boeing 737-200 fleet would be retired and replaced by newer, more fuel-efficient 737 Next Generation series aircraft. On July 12, 2005, WestJet announced that it had completed the sale of its remaining Boeing 737-200 to Miami-based Apollo Aviation Group.

On January 9, 2006, the last Boeing 737-200 was flown during a fly-by ceremony at the WestJet hangar in Calgary, piloted by WestJet founder Don Bell and was a charter flight from Las Vegas to Calgary.

In 2003 and 2004, WestJet donated two of its 737-200s to post-secondary schools in western Canada, one to the British Columbia Institute of Technology and a second to the Southern Alberta Institute of Technology's Art Smith Aero Centre.

In July 2020, WestJet retired their fleet of 4 Boeing 767-300ERs due to the COVID-19 pandemic. In January 2021, it was announced that the four 767-300 aircraft from WestJet were to be among a total of 11 to be purchased by Amazon and converted to freight use.

WestJet operated in the past the following aircraft:

Livery

WestJet's aircraft are painted white except for the lettering on the fuselage, wings and vertical stabilizer, except for special examples as noted below.

The tail is divided roughly into slanted thirds, coloured (from front to back) navy blue, white and teal. This pattern is used on the outside of the blended winglets at the end of the wings while, on the inside, the winglets are painted white with "WestJet.com" in dark blue lettering.

In February 2010 WestJet introduced a special livery on one Boeing 737-800 aircraft promoting its customer-service promise, or "Care-antee", in both English and French. This aircraft also featured a new tail design. In 2013, the Care-antee aircraft underwent a second livery change in partnership with Disney, featuring Mickey Mouse from the movie Fantasia and adopting the name "Magic Plane". A second Disney aircraft was completed in 2015, named "Frozen Plane", with characters Elsa and Anna on the vertical stabilizer and a similar theme in the cabin.

In May 2018, WestJet unveiled a new livery, the first significant change since the inception of the company. It includes a new font for the word "WestJet"; written across the middle of the aircraft fuselage is "The Spirit of Canada" on the port side and "L'esprit du Canada" on the starboard side.  An updated, stylized maple leaf on the aircraft tail is also included.

On January 17, 2019, WestJet's first Dreamliner was delivered with the name 'Clive Beddoe', a tribute to one of its founder and former chairman of the board of directors. The aircraft is painted in its new livery.

Services

In-flight services

In-flight entertainment 

WestJet's 737 aircraft feature WestJet Connect, an in-flight entertainment system where passengers use their own mobile devices and laptops. The service includes free access to hundreds of TV shows and movies, paid access to the internet, and access to USB and 110 V power at every seat.

WestJet's 787 aircraft features WestJet Connect and large touchscreen seatback monitors at every seat. The monitors include access to hundreds of TV shows and movies, music, magazines, and games like Angry Birds World Tour, and many more. Complimentary headphones are also included at every seat, with business and premium class offering noise-cancelling headphones and economy with standard earbuds. USB and 120V power are also included at every seat.

WestJet Encore aircraft are not equipped with any in-flight entertainment.

In-flight food and beverage 
On flights less than four hours, WestJet offers complimentary beverages and snacks. Alcoholic beverages are available for purchase.

On flights four hours and more, WestJet offers complimentary beverages and snacks, and a buy-on-board meal service in economy on all aircraft. In premium and business class, a complimentary meal and alcoholic beverages are included. When flying to Europe, a complimentary meal, as well as alcoholic beverages are included in all classes.

Cabins

Business Class
Business Class is offered only on Boeing 787 and offers private pods, with direct aisle access. The seats feature electronic flat beds in a 1-2-1 configuration. Complimentary on demand dining, alcoholic and non-alcoholic beverages are included. On international flights, an amenity kit is provided. WestJet's business class is the only airline in Canada with fully extendable privacy screens.

Premium Class
Premium Class is offered on all mainline aircraft. It varies depending on aircraft type.

On WestJet's 787, Premium Class is in a separate, dedicated cabin. Larger seats with greater recline are offered in a 2-3-2 configuration. Complimentary hot meals, alcoholic and non-alcoholic beverages are included. A self-serve social area is also available. On international flights, an amenity kit is provided.

On WestJet's 737, Premium Class is separated from economy with sky dividers and curtain. Larger seats with greater recline are offered in a 2-2 configuration. Complimentary plated hot meals (select flights), alcoholic and non-alcoholic beverages are included.

Economy Class
Economy Class varies depending on aircraft type.

On WestJet's 787, economy seats have a pitch of 31" and are offered in a 3-3-3 configuration. Complimentary hot meals, alcoholic and non-alcoholic beverages are included when flying internationally.

On WestJet's 737s, economy seats have a pitch of 31"–34" and are offered in a 3-3 configuration. Complimentary non-alcoholic beverages and snacks are included.

Airport lounges
WestJet opened its flagship business lounge, Elevation Lounge, in 2020, at Calgary International Airport. Westjet has plans for future Elevation lounges at its other main hubs YVR Vancouver International Airport and YYZ Toronto Pearson International Airport. Westjet also has agreements with third-party service providers to provide pay-per-use access for customers, and free access to Gold and Platinum members. These agreements include lounges in the following airports:

 Calgary (1) - Aspire Lounge (Transborder)
 Edmonton (2) - Plaza Premium Lounge (Domestic/Intl), Plaza Premium Lounge (Transborder)
 Kingston, Jamaica - Club Kingston
 London (2) - My Lounge, No1 Lounge
 Montego Bay, Jamaica - Club MoBay
 Montreal - National Bank World MasterCard Lounge (Intl)
 Quebec City - V.I.P. Lounge
 Toronto (3) - Plaza Premium Lounge (Domestic), Plaza Premium Lounge (Intl), Plaza Premium Lounge (Transborder)
 Vancouver (4) - Plaza Premium Lounge (Domestic, Pier B), Plaza Premium Lounge (Domestic, Pier C), Plaza Premium Lounge (Transborder), Plaza Premium (Intl)
 Winnipeg - Plaza Premium Lounge (Domestic)

Accidents and incidents

 June 5, 2015 - WestJet Flight 588, a Boeing 737-600 (registration C-GWCT) flying from Toronto Pearson International Airport, overran the runway into grass at Montreal Trudeau International Airport during heavy rain. The aircraft was not damaged.
 January 5, 2018 - WestJet Flight 2425, a Boeing 737-800 (registration C-FDMB) flight from Cancun to Toronto, was struck while parked and on approach to the gate by a Sunwing Airlines Boeing 737-800 (Registration C-FPRP) being towed at Toronto Pearson International Airport. A fire on the Sunwing aircraft's tail was put out by fire crews at the airport. 168 passengers and 6 crew were on board the WestJet aircraft and were evacuated but none were injured; the Sunwing aircraft had no passengers as it was being re-positioned.
January 5, 2020 - WestJet Flight 248, a Boeing 737-800 (registration C-FUJR) flight from Toronto to Halifax, overran the runway into grass while landing in Halifax during heavy snow. The aircraft was not damaged.

References

External links

 
 WestJet Magazine, WestJet's inflight magazine

 
Companies formerly listed on the Toronto Stock Exchange
Air Transport Association of Canada
Low-cost carriers
Companies based in Calgary
Airlines established in 1994
Canadian companies established in 1994
1994 establishments in Alberta
Canadian brands
2019 mergers and acquisitions
Onex Corporation